Miss Georgia is a national beauty pageant in Georgia.

History
The Miss Georgia beauty contest is the biggest national pageant in Georgia since 2003. Since that year the pageant's winner competes at the Miss World competition where London becomes a home of the pageant. Miss Georgia and IC Model Management together develop its pageant to bring the country on International stage. In 2004 Georgia started to participate at the Miss Universe International beauty contest in Ecuador by Nino Murtazashvili of Tbilisi. Usually the main winner goes to Miss World while second title went to Miss Universe as Miss Universe Georgia.

Titleholders

International pageants

Miss Georgia Universe 

The winner of Miss Georgia Universe represents her country at the Miss Universe. On occasion, when the winner does not qualify (due to age) for either contest, a runner-up is sent.

Miss Georgia World

The winner of Miss Georgia World represents her country at the Miss World. On occasion, when the winner does not qualify (due to age) for either contest, a runner-up is sent.:

Notes

References

External links
 Official Miss Georgia website(not valid)

Beauty pageants in Georgia (country)
Awards of Georgia (country)
Georgia